Chris Andrews (born 25 May 1964) is an Irish Sinn Féin politician who has been a Teachta Dála (TD) for the Dublin Bay South constituency since the 2020 general election, and previously from 2007 to 2011 as a Fianna Fáil TD for the Dublin South-East constituency.

Early life and family
He is the grandson of Todd Andrews, a leading Irish republican figure and member of Fianna Fáil following the foundation of the party. His father Niall Andrews and his uncle David Andrews both served as Fianna Fáil TDs, while his first cousin Barry Andrews was elected a Fianna Fáil TD at the 2002 general election and is now an MEP. He was the fourth member of his family to have sat in the Dáil. He is a cousin of the comedy writer and performer David McSavage, and another cousin, Ryan Tubridy, is a chat show host of The Late Late Show on RTÉ One. Andrews is married with two daughters.

Andrews graduated from Maynooth University with a degree in community and youth work.

Political career
In May 2007, Andrews topped the poll in the Dublin South-East constituency, on his second attempt, gaining 6,600 first preferences. He was a member of Dublin City Council between 1999 to 2004, 2006 to 2007 and 2014 to 2020.

He was convenor of the Oireachtas Finance Committee, and was a member of the Trade, Enterprise and Employment Committee and the European Scrutiny Committee in the 30th Dáil.

Support for Palestine
During the 2008–2009 Israel–Gaza conflict he called for an economic, diplomatic and political boycott of Israel, for its ambassador to Ireland to be expelled, and for shops to remove "settler produce" from Israel. He said that Israel had the right to defend itself, but that its disproportionate response meant that "...it can only now be classified as a terror state". He later told a Russian reporter that there was no electricity in Gaza throughout his time there. On 30 May 2010, he was one of three Irish politicians who were prevented from leaving Cyprus by authorities to join an international flotilla carrying aid to the blockaded Gaza Strip.

In March 2011, Andrews set off on another flotilla to Gaza. His shipmates included Sinn Féin's Aengus Ó Snodaigh. In November 2011, Andrews was reported to be on board another ship heading to Gaza on a humanitarian mission.

Twitter account controversy and departure from Fianna Fáil
In the aftermath of the 2011 general election, in which he and many other Fianna Fáil members lost their seats as TDs, Fianna Fáil were struggling in the polls. In August 2012, Andrews left the Fianna Fáil party. He said that he was disillusioned with the lack of direction the party was taking after it was revealed he had been using a Twitter account to anonymously attack party leader Micheál Martin and other senior members, including a constituency rival, Councillor Jim O'Callaghan. Andrews stated that his decision to quit the party was not related to the Twitter account even though his resignation followed two days after he had been confronted about his online trolling activity and cyberbullying of party colleagues.

As a member of Sinn Féin
In September 2013, he joined Sinn Féin and successfully contested the 2014 local elections for the Pembroke South Dock local electoral area of Dublin City Council for the party.

In February 2015, he was selected to contest the new constituency of Dublin Bay South at the 2016 general election; however, he failed to be elected.

He was the Sinn Féin candidate for the Dublin Bay South constituency at the 2020 general election and was elected. Daniel Ceitinn was co-opted to Andrews' seat on Dublin City Council following his election to the Dáil.

In December 2020, Andrews apologised for liking tweets about Laurel Hubbard that were perceived as transphobic by transgender rights campaigners. The tweet criticised transgender women participating in female sports.

See also
Families in the Oireachtas

References

 

1964 births
Living people
Chris
Fianna Fáil TDs
Local councillors in Dublin (city)
Members of the 30th Dáil
Members of the 33rd Dáil
Politicians from County Dublin
Sinn Féin TDs (post-1923)